KQLC (90.7 FM) is a radio station licensed to serve the community of Sealy, Texas. The station is owned by Community Radio, Inc. and airs a Christian Country format.

The station was assigned the call sign KCPC by the Federal Communications Commission on June 22, 2007. The station changed its call sign to KBCP on September 16, 2010, and then to KQLC on October 22, 2010.

References

External links

QLC
Radio stations established in 2010
2010 establishments in Texas
Austin County, Texas
Country radio stations in the United States